The National Resources Mobilization Act, 1940 (4 George VI, Chap. 13) was a statute of the Parliament of Canada passed to provide for better planning of a much greater Canadian war effort, both overseas and in military production at home.

Scope
Modelled on the British Emergency Powers (Defence) Act 1939, as amended in 1940, it gave the Canadian government the power to

This was the basis of all organization for Canada's war production.

Preparation for military readiness
In order to prepare the population for military service, provision was made under the Act for:

 compulsory national registration
 restricting men eligible for military service from obtaining civilian employment in positions considered not to be essential to the war effort, so that women, and men who had been discharged from service or who were ineligible for service, could be hired instead
 requiring men to submit to medical treatment in order to be called up for military service
 conscription

Employment control
The Act was also used to ensure greater efficiency that was required in a wartime economy by:

 requiring employers to report who their employees were
 barring agricultural workers, after March 23, 1942, from obtaining non-agricultural employment (other than in primary industry, active service or military training) without permission
 from June 17, 1942, requiring any worker to obtain a permit before he or she could start working for an employer, and such permission could be refused
 from September 1, 1942, instituting a national system of employment control under the National Selective Service Regulations, 1942, so that no-one could seek a new job without possessing a permit to do so, no employer could advertise for workers without permission, no-one was allowed to be out of work for more than seven days, and anyone could be required to apply for any available full-time suitable work of high or very high labour priority and to accept any such work offered to him. In conjunction with these measures, the Wartime Prices and Trade Board restricted non-essential industrial activity to the minimum needed for civilian requirements (although tensions existed between the Board and the National Selective Service).
 issuing Compulsory Employment Transfer Orders, compelling certain classes of men to engage in essential employment, and requiring their current employers to release them for that purpose, during several stages in 1943:

 From September 1, 1943, employers in high-priority industries were prohibited from releasing any of their employees, and such employees were barred from giving notice of separation, without the written permission of a National Selective Service officer, and such controls continued until September 17, 1945.

Nature of conscription
The Act permitted conscripts (known as "R men" or "zombies") to be used for home defence only and not to be deployed overseas. The "Zombies" were so-called because they were soldiers who could not fight overseas in the war, making them like the zombies of Haitian mythology who were neither dead nor alive, but rather somewhere in-between. In 1942, the Act was amended to remove the prohibition on conscripts serving outside Canada, and the first overseas campaign that NRMA recruits were subsequently involved in was the recapture of the island of Kiska in August 1943. Until November 1944, only those Canadians who had volunteered were sent elsewhere overseas.

The rule prohibiting "Zombies" from being sent to fight overseas was modified after a plebiscite was held on the matter on 27 April 1942 where the majority of people in the 8 English-speaking provinces voted to release Prime Minister William Lyon Mackenzie King from his promise not to send the Zombies overseas. By contrast, Quebec voted by a large majority against overseas conscription in the referendum. As Quebec was the one province that Mackenzie King really wanted to vote yes in the plebiscite, Quebec's non vote placed the prime minister in the dilemma of honoring the wishes of the majority of English Canada vs. alienating the wishes of majority in French Canada. Such an order, authorizing the transfer of 16,000 conscripts to England, was not made until November 1944. This precipitated the Conscription Crisis of 1944, and resulted in several Quebec Liberal MPs leaving the party in protest. 9,667 NRMA recruits were sent to England, of which two-thirds only arrived after V-E Day.

The Zombies were widely disliked and regarded as cowards by the men who had volunteered for overseas service. The Zombies wore a black tie and collared shirt as part of their uniform while volunteers for overseas duties did not. In April 1945 when the men of the First Canadian Army were informed that henceforth they would now wear the Zombie black tie and collared shirt, the writer Farley Mowat serving with the Hastings and Prince Edward Regiment wrote: "the black tie itself was known as the Zombie tie, and the resentment of the volunteers, who were now ordered to wear this symbol of shame, was most outspoken."

References

Further reading

See also

 
 
 "National Resources Mobilization Act".  The Canadian Encyclopedia.

Canadian federal legislation
1940 in Canadian law
World War II legislation
Conscription in Canada
Conscription law